The 2013–14 Vanderbilt Commodores men's basketball team will represent Vanderbilt University in the 2013–14 college basketball season. The team's head coach is Kevin Stallings, in his fifteenth season at Vanderbilt. The team plays their home games at Memorial Gymnasium in Nashville, Tennessee, as a member of the Southeastern Conference.

Previous season
After a 21–10 record and an SEC tournament championship in 2012, the Commodores were in rebuild mode with 88.1% scoring lost heading into 2013.  The Commodores finished 16–17, which was their first losing record since 2002-03 and second under Head Coach Kevin Stallings.  The Commodores, however, did advance to the SEC Tournament semifinals for the fourth consecutive year.

Departures

Roster

Schedule and results

|-
!colspan=12| Non-conference regular season

|-
!colspan=12| SEC regular season

|-
!colspan=12| 2014 SEC tournament

|-
| colspan="12" | *Non-conference game. Rankings from AP poll. All times are in Central Time.
|}

See also
2013–14 Vanderbilt Commodores women's basketball team

References

Vanderbilt
Vanderbilt Commodores men's basketball seasons
Vanderbilt Commodores men's basketball
Vanderbilt Commodores men's basketball